Bussey Glacier is a glacier flowing west from Mount Peary to the head of Waddington Bay on Kyiv Peninsula on the west coast of Graham Land. It was first charted by the French Antarctic Expedition under Jean-Baptiste Charcot, 1908–10, and named by the UK Antarctic Place-Names Committee in 1959 for Group Captain John Bussey of the Directorate of Overseas Surveys.

See also
 List of glaciers in the Antarctic
 Glaciology

References

External links
 SCAR Composite Gazetteer of Antarctica

Glaciers of Graham Coast